Herøy Church is a parish church of the Church of Norway in Herøy Municipality in Nordland county, Norway. It is located in the village of Silvalen on the island of Sør-Herøy. It is the main church for the Herøy parish which is part of the Nord-Helgeland prosti (deanery) in the Diocese of Sør-Hålogaland. The white, wooden church was built in a long church style in the 12th century using plans drawn up by an unknown architect. The church seats about 350 people.

History
The earliest existing historical records of the church date back to the year 1432, but the church was originally constructed during the second half of the 1100s. The church has a rectangular nave, a tower to the west, and a narrower choir with a semicircular apse. The choir and apse have a lower roof line than the nave. Research on the building has shown that the choir part is the oldest part of the existing building with the apse and nave built a little later. Originally, the current choir was the stone nave that was attached to a wooden building. The wood building was later torn down and the stone building was expanded. Over the years, the church fell into disrepair. In the 1960s, the church was thoroughly renovated by the architect John Egil Tverdahl.

Media gallery

See also
List of churches in Sør-Hålogaland

References

Herøy, Nordland
Churches in Nordland
Stone churches in Norway
12th-century churches in Norway
12th-century establishments in Norway
Long churches in Norway